Iproca ishigakiana is a species of beetle in the family Cerambycidae. It was described by Breuning and Ohbayashi in 1966.

References

Apomecynini
Beetles described in 1966